Rozavlea is a commune in Maramureș County, Maramureș, Romania. It is composed of two villages, Rozalvea and Sâlța (established in 2006).

References

Communes in Maramureș County
Localities in Romanian Maramureș